Jacob Vandenberg Brower (January 11, 1844 in York, Michigan –1905) was a prolific writer of the Upper Midwest region of the United States who championed the location and protection of the utmost headwaters of the Mississippi and Missouri rivers.

He was born in Michigan and moved to Minnesota.  In 1862 he served with Henry Hastings Sibley during wars against the Sioux in Minnesota.

After the war he was County Auditor and County Attorney for Todd County, Minnesota.  The City of Browerville, Minnesota is named in his honor. In 1872, he was elected to the Minnesota State Legislature, where he represented the 41st District from 1873 to 1874.

Brower was buried in the North Star Cemetery in Saint Cloud, Minnesota.  His monument recognizes him as the founder of Itasca State Park and the Minnesota State Park system.

Lake Itasca
In 1888 acting as surveyor he visited Lake Itasca to settle a dispute over the source of the Mississippi River.

The issue was whether Nicollet Creek at the southern tip of the Lake Itasca and flows into the lake was the official start of the Mississippi.  Brower followed the stream through swamps, ponds to Lake Hernando de Soto.  Brower spent five months on Lake Itasca and eventually suggested that since he believed that the Nicollet Creek was an intermittent stream that it should not qualify as the source.

Brower was to lead a campaign to stop logging around Lake Itasca by companies owned by Friedrich Weyerhäuser.  On April 20, 1891 the state legislature by a margin of one approved the plans for a state park.

The official visitor center for the park is now called the Jacob V. Brower Visitor Center and Brower is often referred to as the "Father of Lake Itasca."

Brower's Spring
In the late 1800s he questioned the conventional wisdom that Meriwether Lewis had discovered the true source of the Missouri River on August 12, 1805, above Lemhi Pass on the Continental Divide at the source of Trail Creek.

Studying maps, he said the source should be 100 miles further away at the source of Hell Roaring Creek at about 8,800 feet on Mount Jefferson in the Centennial Mountains on the Montana side of the Continental Divide.

In 1888 he visited the site of Brower's Spring and left a metal tablet with his name and date where he believed the source to be located.  In 1896 he published his findings "The Missouri: Its Utmost Source."

Both sources ultimately drain into the Jefferson River which combines with the Madison and the Gallatin Rivers to form the Missouri at Missouri Headwaters State Park.

References

External links
Brower's Map of Lake Itasca

1844 births
1905 deaths
County auditors in the United States
County officials in Minnesota
Writers from Michigan
19th-century American businesspeople